Mars 2M may refer to:

 Mars 2M No.521, Soviet Mars probe
 Mars 2M No.522, Soviet Mars probe

See also 
 Mars 2MV-4 (disambiguation)
 Mars II (disambiguation)